Ritchie John Torres (born March 12, 1988) is an American politician from New York. A member of the Democratic Party, Torres is the U.S. representative for New York's 15th congressional district. The district covers most of the South Bronx. It is one of the smallest districts by area in the country, covering only a few square miles. Torres represents the poorest Congressional district in New York State.

Torres served as the New York City Council member for the 15th district from 2013 to 2020. He was the first openly gay candidate to be elected to legislative office in the Bronx, and the council's youngest member. Torres chaired the Committee on Public Housing, and was a deputy majority leader. As chair of the Oversight and Investigations Committee he focused on taxi medallion predatory loans, and the city's Third Party Transfer Program. In 2016, Torres was a delegate for the Bernie Sanders campaign.

The district is one of the most Democratic leaning congressional districts in the country. Torres won the November 2020 general election, and assumed office on January 3, 2021. This made him and Mondaire Jones the first openly gay Black men elected to Congress. It also made Torres the first openly gay Afro-Latino elected to Congress. As such, he is one of the nine co-chairs of the Congressional LGBTQ+ Equality Caucus in the 117th United States Congress.

Early life and education 
Ritchie Torres was born on March 12, 1988, in the Bronx. He is Afro-Latino; his father is from Puerto Rico and his mother is African-American. Torres was raised Catholic, but says he is no longer practicing.

Torres was raised by his mother in Throggs Neck Houses, a public housing project in the Throggs Neck neighborhood of the East Bronx, where he was frequently hospitalized for asthma as a result of the mold in their apartment. Of growing up economically disadvantaged in "slum conditions", Torres has said, "I was raised by a single mother who had to raise three children on minimum wage and I lived in conditions of mold and vermin, lead and leaks." His mother raised him, his twin brother, and their sister. He was upset by the $269 million city-subsidized Trump Golf Links built "across the street" in Ferry Point Park rather than housing for struggling New Yorkers; the course was built on a landfill, took 14 years to be developed, and opened in 2015. He vowed then to fight for their well-being. In junior high, Torres realized he was gay but did not come out, fearing homophobic violence. He has described being "brutally assaulted" by a bully in the third grade.

Torres attended Herbert H. Lehman High School, served in the inaugural class of the Coro New York Exploring Leadership Program, and later worked as an intern in the offices of the mayor and the attorney general. He came out while a sophomore "during a schoolwide forum on marriage equality".

Torres enrolled at New York University, but dropped out at the beginning of his sophomore year, as he was suffering from severe depression. He struggled with suicidal thoughts based on his sexuality. As he recovered, Torres resumed working for council member James Vacca, eventually becoming Vacca's housing director. In that role, Torres conducted site inspections and documented conditions, ensuring housing issues were promptly and adequately addressed.

New York city council 
At 25 years old, Torres ran to succeed Joel Rivera as the councilmember for the 15th district of the New York city council. The district includes Allerton, Belmont, Bronx Park, Claremont Village, Crotona Park, Fordham, Mount Eden, Mount Hope, Norwood, Parkchester, Tremont, Van Nest, West Farms and Williamsbridge in the Bronx.

When he won the Democratic nomination for New York city council, Torres became one of the first openly gay political candidates in the Bronx to win a Democratic nomination, and upon victory in the general election became the first openly gay public official in the Bronx. He was also the youngest elected city official. Torres also served as a deputy leader of the city council.

Public housing 
Upon his election, Torres requested the chairmanship of the council's committee on public housing, tasked with overseeing the New York City Housing Authority (NYCHA); as of July 2019, it is the "nation's largest public housing system", which "provides housing to more than 400,000 low-income residents" in "176,000 apartments across 325 complexes". He made "the living conditions of the city's most underserved residents a signature priority". In this role he helped secure $3 million for Concourse Village, Inc., a nearly 1,900-unit housing cooperative in the South Bronx. According to 2010 United States Census data the South Bronx is among the poorest districts in the nation. The cooperative is subsidized by the Mitchell-Lama Housing Program, offering "income-restricted rentals and below-market value buy-in for co-ops". He also secured nearly $1 million to renovate Dennis Lane Apartments, a Mitchell-Lama co-op in the heart of his district, and "played a crucial role in exposing the city's failures to address lead-paint contamination."

In August 2019, along with fellow council member Vanessa Gibson, Torres announced Right To Counsel 2.0, an expansion of legal aid to NYCHA tenants facing eviction. Since the original law passed in 2017, providing legal help throughout the entire eviction case, the council has found 84% of tenants were able to stay in their homes. The council members "say this will help keep families together and prevent displacement." Torres said, "NYCHA is one of the worst evictees in the city ... Not just one of the worst landlords, but one of the worst evictors. In 2018 alone, 838 families lost their homes in the hands of the NYCHA."

Combating gig worker tip theft 
In April 2019, Torres worked on legislation aimed to compel companies that employ gig workers to be transparent if the worker's tips are diverted to pay base salary. Mobile app delivery companies, like DoorDash—which has freelance workers pickup and deliver meals from restaurants—Amazon's Prime Now, and Instacart, usually allow customers to add a gratuity, but the companies were counting the tips toward regular payment. Torres characterized the practice as exploiting "an underclass of independent contractors", and hopes the city council can ban the practice altogether. Vox noted the gig economy is in need of regulation for the estimated 57 million workers (in the U.S.) who have little protection, and few if any benefits. Torres's bill would compel these companies to be transparent about the practice "by explicitly stating it in their terms of service or by sending a notification as a transaction is being approved".

Taxi medallion predatory loans 
As chair of the oversight and investigations committee, newly empowered in January 2018 by city council speaker Corey Johnson, Torres said he had documentation that as early as 2010 the Bloomberg administration was "aware that medallion prices could crumple", a year before ride hailing pioneer Uber started its service in the city. Medallion prices dropped considerably in 2014, likely due to competition from ride-share companies. Medallion owners sued the city and Uber in November 2015. By 2017, 60,000 ride-share vehicles outnumbered medallion vehicles by almost 4 to 1, and many medallion owners faced the prospect of bankruptcy or severe debt because of the low medallion prices, which few were willing to pay. Torres said the "medallion market collapse is a cautionary tale" and "one of the greatest government scandals in the history of New York City".

In July 2019, the city council considered how to address the city's taxicab industry with the National Taxi Workers' Alliance's concerns that the NYC Taxi and Limousine Commission knowingly sold medallions at inflated prices, bringing in $1 billion in revenue to city government, while saddling "thousands of drivers with impossible debt loads", leading to suicides. Efforts continued, and in 2022, culminated in the Medallion Relief Program.

Cashless businesses 
In July 2019, Torres proposed legislation to address the movement in New York toward cashless business practices at stores and restaurants. He did so to preserve access for those who rely on cash for their purchases. The businesses accept only bank cards and e-commerce payments rather than hard currency, in part for higher efficiency, possibly streamlining both cashiering, and accounting; and for security reasons, as having cash risks robbery. According to the Federal Deposit Insurance Corporation, in 2017 16.9% of African-American households "and 14% of Latino households did not have a bank account"; 6.5% of all households did not have a bank account; and 18.7% with accounts also used non-insured institutions for financial transactions. In New York City, 12% did not have bank accounts in 2013, including "domestic violence survivors who don't wish to be traced and undocumented immigrants as some of those who may face significant challenges when opening bank accounts". They instead often use payday loans and check cashing facilities. Torres's proposal would fine noncompliant businesses, while allowing them to refuse currency higher than $20 bills. It also prohibits charging more for using cash.

Third-Party Transfer program 
In July 2019, Torres, as chair of the oversight and investigation committee, and Robert Cornegy, chair of the committees on housing and buildings, released a report from the joint committee that conducted a city council forensic investigation into the city's Third-Party Transfer (TPT) program. The TPT was started in 1996 under Giuliani's administration to let the Department of Housing and Preservation (HPD) transfer "derelict, tax-delinquent buildings to nonprofits that could rehabilitate and manage them", ostensibly for working-class people, freeing the city from ownership, or responsibility for tenants. HPD followed a rule selecting "every other building in the same tax block with a lien—even for a few hundred dollars"—if even one was picked for TPT. Mayor Bill de Blasio's administration characterized the TPT as a tool for taking over "distressed properties" in "blighted" areas". The report, however, holds that characterization is in tension with its findings, which implicate malfeasance by both NYC's HPD and the Department of Finance (DOF), detailing how the agencies were "targeting and taking of numerous black and brown owned properties, and thus stripping these communities of millions of dollars of generational wealth". According to Torres, "TPT is quite different from and far harsher than a typical foreclosure from the perspective of a property owner. If you are the target of a foreclosure, you get a share of the proceeds from the sale of your property. Under TPT, the city can completely strip you of all the equity in your property". The TPT process strips the minority owner of the property and its value, and mitigates the sweat equity and resources invested—all with no compensation.

LGBTQ advocacy 

Torres helped open the first homeless shelter for LGBTQ youth in the Bronx. He also secured funds for senior centers to serve LGBTQ people in all five NYC boroughs.

Guns and gang violence 
In August 2019, Torres announced the city council was awarding $36.2 million for gun violence prevention and reduction. He said shooting incidents in New York City were up from 413 in the first half of 2018 to 551 in the same period of 2019.

U.S. House of Representatives

Elections

2020 

Torres has said that he is "intent on advancing politically", and has been floated as a future candidate for mayor of New York City. His "goal is to be a national champion for the urban poor."

In March 2019, Torres expressed interest in running against incumbent congressman José E. Serrano. After Serrano announced his retirement, Torres was among those speculated to run for his seat. In his announcement he came out as dealing with depression. Torres said he was seeking the office to pursue "his legislative passions of overhauling public housing and focusing on the issues of concentrated poverty". The 15th congressional district is the nation's poorest in terms of median income. Torres said, "if you are on a mission to fight racially concentrated poverty ... then you have to be a policymaker on the national stage". He favors maximizing social housing in the nation, including the ending of land-use bans of apartments, which he says will result in the reduction of carbon emissions, as well as increase affordable housing. Torres came under criticism for his willingness to take real estate cash donations during his campaign.

Torres's main opponent as he started campaigning in the Democratic primary was Rubén Díaz Sr., a conservative Democrat and Pentecostal minister, who does not believe in, and openly stood in opposition to, same-sex marriage. Media outlets contextualized the contest between the two, noting their age difference; contrasting levels of experience; and Torres's open homosexuality versus Díaz's track record of anti-LGBTQ rhetoric. Torres said he saw Díaz as "temperamentally and ideologically indistinguishable" from Donald Trump. According to The New York Times, Díaz had "a decades-long history of making homophobic remarks"; LGBTQ Nation said his anti-LGBTQ rhetoric started in the early 1990s, right after his start in city politics, when he claimed the city's hosting the 1994 Gay Games "would spread AIDS and corrupt children". In February 2019, Díaz said that the City Council was "controlled by homosexuals"; in response, the council dissolved a subcommittee he chaired. , Torres had raised $500,000 and Díaz $80,000. Torres was endorsed by the LGBTQ Victory Fund and the Congressional LGBTQ Equality Caucus (Equality PAC).

The Democratic primary was held on June 23. Although an official winner had not yet been declared, Torres declared victory in the primary on July 22. As the seat for which he was running is one of the safest Democratic seats in the country, he was expected to win the general election, after which he would become one of the first openly gay black Congressmen in U.S. history, along with Mondaire Jones in the 17th district. On August 4, local election officials declared Torres the winner of the primary. This all but assured him of being the next congressman from this heavily Democratic, Latino-majority district. The 15th and its predecessors have been in Democratic hands for all but 11 months since 1927, the lone break in this tradition being American Labor Party member Leo Isacson from February 1948 to January 1949. It has been held by Latino congressmen since 1971.

Tenure 

Torres won the November general election. He took office on January 3, 2021. Upon his swearing-in, he became the first openly gay Afro-Latin American member of Congress.

On August 6, 2021, Torres introduced H.R. 4980, which would "ensure that any individual traveling on a flight that departs from or arrives to an airport inside the United States or a territory of the United States is fully vaccinated against COVID-19."

Political positions

Environment 
Torres has voiced support for a Green New Deal and was endorsed by the League of Conservation Voters in 2020. He suggested that public housing should be "a model for green and energy efficient buildings to help combat climate change while addressing its capital needs." Torres has called the Cross Bronx Expressway "a structure of environmental racism" and supports a plan to cover the highway with green space.

Foreign policy 
Torres has called himself "the embodiment of a pro-Israel progressive". After winning election in 2020, he announced that he would not join the Squad, a group of left-wing Democratic representatives, due to their support of the Boycott, Divestment and Sanctions (BDS) movement. Torres contrasted BDS's stagnancy with what he called the "path to peace" presented by the Abraham Accords. He supports a two-state solution for Israel and Palestine. Torres has said his first visit to Israel, led by the Jewish Community Relations Council in 2015, was a "life-changing experience".

In 2023, Torres was among 56 Democrats to vote in favor of H.Con.Res. 21 which directed President Joe Biden to remove U.S. troops from Syria within 180 days.

Committee assignments 
 Committee on Financial Services
 Committee on Homeland Security
 Select Committee on Strategic Competition between the United States and the Chinese Communist Party

Caucus memberships
Congressional Progressive Caucus
Congressional LGBTQ+ Equality Caucus (Co-chair)
Congressional Black Caucus
Congressional Hispanic Caucus

Electoral history

Notes

See also
 List of African-American United States representatives
 List of Hispanic and Latino Americans in the United States Congress
 List of LGBT people from New York City
 LGBT culture in New York City
 Nuyorican
 Puerto Ricans in New York City

References

External links

Representative Ritchie Torres official U.S. House website
Campaign website

|-

|- 

Living people
1988 births
21st-century American politicians
African-American New York City Council members
African-American members of the United States House of Representatives
African-American people in New York (state) politics
American politicians of Puerto Rican descent
Democratic Party members of the United States House of Representatives from New York (state)
Gay politicians
Former Roman Catholics
Hispanic and Latino American members of the United States Congress
LGBT African Americans
American LGBT city council members
LGBT Hispanic and Latino American people
LGBT members of the United States Congress
LGBT people from New York (state)
New York City Council members
Hispanic and Latino American New York City Council members
People from Throggs Neck, Bronx
Politicians from the Bronx
Puerto Rican people in New York (state) politics
21st-century African-American politicians
20th-century African-American people